Minsk are a bandy club from Minsk, Belarus.

References

Bandy clubs in Belarus
Sport in Minsk